Evangeline-Miscouche is a provincial electoral district for the Legislative Assembly of Prince Edward Island, Canada.

Evangeline-Miscouche is a francophone-majority riding.

Members
The riding has elected the following Members of the Legislative Assembly:

Election results

2016 electoral reform plebiscite results

References

 Evangeline-Miscouche information

Prince Edward Island provincial electoral districts